Mobile Transactions Zambia Ltd (MT) is an enterprise launched in 2009 that aims to give its customers access to various financial services using mobile technology and a country-wide network of agents.

Structure 
MT is a start-up business based in Lusaka, Zambia. Although it keeps in mind its initial social goals of reducing transaction costs and providing a secure payment method to enlarge and facilitate access to the market and is closely connected with development sector organizations, government agencies and microfinance institutions, it has evolved into a for-profit organisation.
MT's CEO, Mike Quinn, who completed an MBA at the University of Oxford in 2008, considers himself as an 'entrepreneur with a good conscience'. He runs the company as a normal business, as far as fundraising and investment decisions are concerned. The Grassroot Business Fund (GBF), a non-profit venture capital firm, provided MT its initial financing as well as legal assistance, and MT is soon to carry out an equity funding.

Principle of operation 
MT's service is based on a nationwide network of over 200 agents, which it plans to expand to other Sub-Saharan countries.

Money transfers 
The sender gives an amount of cash, inclusive of a small transaction fee, to a local MT agent. They must confirm the destination town and enter a PIN code on the agent's phone, in exchange of a receipt. The recipient must provide the transaction reference number and the PIN code to get the cash from their local agent.

This system has been improved to provide payment services from a MT Client to either a bank or a MT account (the payment must be cashed at a MT agent). MT also offers electronic vouchers services.

Positive effects on development 

Zambia's banking system imposes high fees on customers and only includes a minor part of the population. Therefore, as only 2 Zambians out of 10 own a bank account, MT intends to develop the cashless system to render financial transactions easier, faster and safer than with cash and paper money.
A more direct connection between the sender and the recipient lowers transaction costs and suppresses expensive and time wasting intermediaries. NGOs wishing to send money, companies that used to pay thousands of employees under the surveillance of armed guards and farmers who get paid more quickly and transparently, benefit from it. Besides, people feel safer as their money is stored electronically.

MT's financial products and services may have a positive effect on the overall development of the country. First, it spurs the enrichment of each individuals through the commissions earned by its agents and the nationwide increase in exchanges. Electronic money can connect socially or geographically marginalized people to the markets. Second, mobile accounts can be used to buy phone credit, pay school fees, order fertilizer or a machine. Lastly, the recording of electronic payments lets customers follow their accounting history, encouraging them to spend or borrow responsibly and facilitating future loans.

Challenge 
In spite of being Zambia's fastest growing company, MT will face some difficulties regarding its continental expansion. Zambia's favourable regulatory environment, low initial banking penetration and weak competition offer incentives that may not exist in other Sub-Saharan countries, thus making the success of possible expansions across national borders uncertain.

References 

Companies based in Lusaka
Financial services companies established in 2009